School struggle can refer to:
 School struggle (Netherlands) (19th and 20th century)
 First School War (Belgium, 1880s)
 Second School War (Belgium, 1950s)